The Federação de Futebol do Estado do Espírito Santo (English: Football Association of Espírito Santo state) was founded on May 2, 1917, and it manages all the official football tournaments within the state of Espírito Santo, which are the Campeonato Capixaba, the Campeonato Capixaba lower levels, and the Copa Espírito Santo, and represents the clubs at the Brazilian Football Confederation (CBF).

References

Espírito Santo
Football in Espírito Santo
Sports organizations established in 1917